Pęckowo railway station is a railway station serving the village of Pęckowo, in the Greater Poland Voivodeship, Poland. The station is located on the Poznań–Szczecin railway. The train services are operated by PKP and Przewozy Regionalne.

Train services
The station is served by the following services:

Regional services (R) Szczecin - Stargard - Dobiegniew - Krzyz - Wronki - Poznan

References

 This article is based upon a translation of the Polish language version as of November 2016.

External links

Railway stations in Greater Poland Voivodeship
Czarnków-Trzcianka County